The 1984 NBA World Championship Series was the championship round of the National Basketball Association (NBA)'s 1983–84 season, and the culmination of the season's playoffs. The Eastern Conference champion Boston Celtics defeated the Western Conference champion Los Angeles Lakers in seven games. Celtics forward Larry Bird averaged 27 points and 14 rebounds a game during the series, earning the NBA Finals Most Valuable Player (MVP).

This series was a rematch of the Los Angeles Lakers and Boston Celtics after their rivalry was revived in 1979 with the Magic Johnson–Larry Bird pair entering the league. After altering wins with the Lakers, the Celtics won Game 7 and the series with a score of 111–102.

This was the last NBA Finals to use the 2–2–1–1–1 format until 2014. The following year, the NBA Finals format was changed to 2–3–2 after Red Auerbach complained about the constant travelling during the Finals. While the 2–2–1–1–1 format remained intact for the remainder of the playoff rounds, the 2–3–2 format would be used until 2013.

Background
The seeds of the 1984 Finals were first sown five years earlier, during the 1979 NCAA Men's Division I Basketball Tournament. In the final game of the tournament, Larry Bird and his erstwhile unbeaten Indiana State Sycamores lost to Magic Johnson and his Michigan State Spartans by the score of 75–64. After the tournament, both entered the NBA in the 1979–80 season with high expectations. Bird, who was selected 6th in the 1978 NBA draft but committed back to Indiana State for his senior season, was named Rookie of the Year after leading the Celtics to a 32-game turnaround from the previous year, going from 29 to 61 wins. The expected Celtics–Lakers finals, however, never happened. The Philadelphia 76ers defeated the Celtics in the conference finals before losing to the Lakers in the 1980 NBA Finals, with Johnson earning Finals MVP honors for his Game 6 performance. Since then Bird won a championship in 1981, then Magic led the Lakers to the finals in 1982 and 1983, winning in the former.

Boston Celtics

In the 1983–84 season, the Celtics won 62 games to lead the league. The Celtics were led by Bird, who won his first MVP award, and was complemented by 1981 Finals MVP Cedric Maxwell, first-time all-star and Sixth Man Award winner Kevin McHale, Robert Parish, Gerald Henderson and Danny Ainge. Boston's most crucial addition was Dennis Johnson, whom they acquired from the Phoenix Suns in the offseason in hopes of addressing their porous back-court defense.

In the playoffs, the Celtics defeated the Washington Bullets in four, the New York Knicks in seven, and the Milwaukee Bucks in five.

Los Angeles Lakers

The Lakers were coming off a four-game sweep by the Philadelphia 76ers in the previous year's finals. Before the season began, the Lakers traded long-time guard Norm Nixon to the San Diego Clippers in exchange for the draft rights to Byron Scott. The trade signaled a transition period, as some of the key players from the first two championships gave way to younger talent. Despite the changes, it did not stop the Lakers from finishing with the best record (54–28) in the Western Conference, powered by their one-two punch of Kareem Abdul-Jabbar and Magic Johnson.

During the playoffs, the Lakers defeated the Kansas City Kings in three, the Dallas Mavericks in five, and the Phoenix Suns in six. However, the Lakers suffered a key injury when their 3rd leading scorer, Jamaal Wilkes (17 PPG) was ruled out of the finals. This cost the Lakers valuable depth, as James Worthy, a key contributor off the bench, would now have to start in Wilkes' place.

Road to the Finals

Regular season series
The Los Angeles Lakers won both games in the regular season series:

Series summary

Game 1

The Lakers opened the series with a 115-109 victory at Boston Garden.

Game 2

In Game 2, the Lakers led 113-111 with 18 seconds left when Gerald Henderson stole a James Worthy pass to score a game tying layup. The Lakers then inbounded the ball and Magic Johnson inexplicably dribbled the clock out during regulation time. The Celtics eventually prevailed in overtime 124-121, thanks to Scott Wedman's game-winning shot from the baseline with 14 ticks left.

Game 3

In Game 3, the Lakers raced to an easy 137-104 victory as Magic Johnson dished out 21 assists, an NBA Finals record. After the game, Larry Bird said his team played like "sissies" in an attempt to light a fire under his teammates. It was Boston's worst playoff defeat in franchise history to that date.

Game 4

In Game 4, the Lakers had a five-point game lead with less than a minute to play, but made several execution errors, including Magic Johnson's bad pass to Robert Parish late in the fourth quarter, and missing two crucial free throws in OT as the Celtics tied the game and then came away with a 129-125 victory in overtime. Johnson was called "Tragic Johnson" by Celtics fans due to the two crucial errors he committed in Game 4 (the Parish steal, followed by two botched free throws in OT). The Lakers took an early lead in overtime, but a controversial foul call foul on Kareem Abdul-Jabbar, with 16 seconds remaining in regulation, had been his 6th foul, and he was out of the game. The Laker momentum was stalled, and Larry Bird came up with a crucial jumper over Magic Johnson with 16 seconds remaining in overtime, then M.L. Carr stole James Worthy's inbounds pass followed by a dunk to seal the win. The game was also marked by Celtic forward Kevin McHale's clothesline take-down of Laker forward Kurt Rambis on a breakaway layup which triggered the physical aspect of the rivalry. Larry Bird would go after Kareem Abdul-Jabbar later on in the third quarter, and 1981 Finals MVP Cedric Maxwell further antagonized the Lakers by following a missed James Worthy free throw by crossing the lane with his hands around his own neck, symbolizing that Worthy was "choking" under pressure. Also, Bird pushed Michael Cooper to the baseline following the inbound play during the second quarter.

Game 4 of the 1984 Finals marked the last Finals game to go into overtime until Game 2 of the 1990 NBA Finals.

Game 5

In Game 5, the Celtics took a 3-2 series lead with a 121-103 victory, as Larry Bird scored 34 points and grabbed 17 rebounds. The game was known as the "Heat Game", as it was played under  heat, and without any air conditioning, at Boston Garden. The Celtics did not warm up with their sweat pants on because of extreme heat, and an oxygen tank was provided to give air to an aging Kareem Abdul-Jabbar. Referee Hugh Evans became dehydrated and fainted at one point in the first half. He worked the first half, but was replaced by John Vanak for the second half. It was also the last time that a team with home court advantage in the NBA finals played Game 5 on its own floor until 2014. The next year, the NBA Finals switched to the 2-3-2 format with Game 5 going to the team without home-court advantage, which continued through 2013.

Game 6

In Game 6, the Lakers evened the series with a 119-108 victory. In the game the Lakers answered the Celtics' rough tactics when Laker forward James Worthy shoved Cedric Maxwell into a basket support. After the game a Laker fan threw a beer at Celtics guard M.L. Carr as he left the floor, causing him to label the series "all-out-war."

Game 7

In Game 7, the heat that was an issue in Game 5 was not as bad (indoor temperatures hovered around  during the game, due to additional fans being brought in to try to cool the air). The Celtics were led by Cedric Maxwell who had 24 points, eight rebounds and eight assists as they came away with a 111-102 victory. In the game, the Lakers rallied to cut a 14-point-deficit to three with one minute remaining when Cedric Maxwell knocked the ball away from Magic Johnson. Dennis Johnson responded by sinking two free throws to seal the victory. Larry Bird was named MVP of the series.

The series was the eighth time in NBA history that the Celtics and Lakers met in the NBA finals, with Boston winning each time, and the first championship that the Celtics claimed at home since 1966.

Player statistics

Boston Celtics

|-
| align="left" |  || 7 || 0 || 14.0 || .432 || .250 || .500 || 1.1 || 2.1 || .07 || 0.0 || 6.0 
|-! style="background:#FDE910;"
| align="left" |  || 7 || 7 || 43.6 || .484 || .667 || .842 || 14.0 || 3.6 || 2.1 || 1.1 || 27.4 
|-
| align="left" |  || 7 || 0 || 8.0 || .333 || .000 || .500 || 0.9 || 0.6 || 0.1 || 0.0 || 2.0 
|-
| align="left" |  || 4 || 0 || 7.0 || .364 || .000 || .833 || 0.8 || 0.5 || 0.5 || 0.0 || 3.3 
|-
| align="left" |  || 3 || 0 || 3.7 || .400 || .000 || .000 || 0.3 || 0.0 || 0.0 || 0.3 || 1.3 
|-
| align="left" |  || 7 || 7 || 25.6 || .468 || .000 || .667 || 2.6 || 4.0 || 1.4 || 0.0 || 12.3 
|-
| align="left" |  || 7 || 7 || 36.4 || .395 || .500 || .865 || 3.0 || 4.7 || 1.6 || 0.3 || 17.6 
|-
| align="left" |  || 4 || 0 || 3.3 || .250 || .000 || .000 || 0.3 || 0.5 || 0.0 || 0.3 || 0.5 
|-
| align="left" |  || 7 || 7 || 34.6 || .458 || .000 || .855 || 5.6 || 3.3 || 1.1 || 0.3 || 13.0 
|-
| align="left" |  || 7 || 0 || 30.6 || .452 || .000 || .778 || 5.9 || 1.1 || 0.3 || 1.1 || 13.4 
|-
| align="left" |  || 7 || 7 || 36.6 || .440 || .000 || .588 || 11.4 || 1.3 || 1.6 || 1.6 || 15.4 
|-
| align="left" |  || 4 || 0 || 18.3 || .459 || .500 || .000 || 5.3 || 2.5 || 0.0 || 0.0 || 9.3 

Los Angeles Lakers

|-
| align="left" |  || 7 || 7 || 38.9 || .481 || .000 || .679 || 8.1 || 4.4 || 1.7 || 2.1 || 26.6 
|-
| align="left" |  || 7 || 7 || 37.4 || .468 || .500 || .773 || 3.6 || 5.3 || 1.1 || 0.7 || 13.4 
|-
| align="left" |  || 7 || 7 || 42.1 || .560 || .000 || .744 || 7.7 || 13.6 || 2.0 || 0.9 || 18.0 
|-
| align="left" |  || 3 || 0 || 4.0 || .500 || .000 || .750 || 2.3 || 2.7 || 0.7 || 0.0 || 0.3 
|-
| align="left" |  || 6 || 0 || 24.3 || .459 || .000 || .655 || 5.5 || 0.7 || 0.3 || 1.3 || 12.5
|-
| align="left" |  || 3 || 0 || 14.0 || .375 || .000 || .714 || 2.7 || 0.0 || 0.7 || 0.3 || 7.7 
|-
| align="left" |  || 7 || 0 || 8.6 || .421 || .000 || .857 || 3.1 || 0.0 || 0.0 || 0.1 || 4.0 
|-
| align="left" |  || 7 || 7 || 22.3 || .629 || .000 || .545 || 6.4 || 0.6 || 0.3 || 0.3 || 7.1 
|-
| align="left" |  || 7 || 0 || 15.0 || .474 || .200 || .714 || 1.1 || 0.7 || 1.0 || 0.0 || 6.0 
|-
| align="left" |  || 2 || 0 || 3.5 || .667 || .000 || .000 || 1.0 || 0.5 || 0.0 || 0.0 || 2.0 
|-
| align="left" |  || 7 || 0 || 14.1 || .448 || .000 || .750 || 1.9 || 0.4 || 0.3 || 0.0 || 4.6 
|-
| align="left" |  || 7 || 7 || 39.1 || .638 || .000 || .656 || 4.4 || 2.3 || 1.4 || 0.3 || 22.1

Team rosters

Boston Celtics

Los Angeles Lakers

Television coverage
The 1984 championship series scored high TV ratings. All the playoff action was documented on the 1984 NBA Season documentary Pride and Passion, narrated by Dick Stockton. During that year Lesley Visser, Stockton's wife, became the first woman to cover the NBA Finals for CBS. She reported on the Celtics' sideline while Pat O'Brien reported on the Lakers' sideline. Stockton, the play-by-play announcer for the series, was joined by Tom Heinsohn, and the duo would call the next four NBA Finals until .

Aftermath
Reflecting back on the series, Magic Johnson said ". . . (the Lakers) learned a valuable lesson. Only the strong survive. . . talent just don't get it. That's the first time the (80's) Lakers ever encountered that, someone stronger minded." The teams met again in the 1985 finals, which the Lakers won 4–2.

In 1986, they failed a third straight NBA Finals meeting (it was later accomplished 31 years later by the Cleveland Cavaliers and the Golden State Warriors), as the Lakers were eliminated in the Conference Finals by the Houston Rockets. The Lakers and the Celtics met again in 1987 where the Lakers won in six games.

See also
 1984 NBA Playoffs

References

External links
 NBA History
 Boston Globe story about Game 5 (published 7 June 2009)

National Basketball Association Finals
Finals
NBA
NBA
20th century in Los Angeles County, California
1984 in Boston
Basketball competitions in Boston
Basketball competitions in Inglewood, California
NBA Finals
NBA Finals
NBA Finals
NBA Finals